Pacific Drive is an Australian television series made by Village Roadshow in association with New World International for the Nine Network which screened for 390 episodes from 29 January 1996 to December 1997, when it concluded it was show in reruns being in a late night timeslot for years. It was also repeated (and edited to tone down its racier overtones) for a daytime slot on Nine while they lobbied (unsuccessfully) to the Australian Broadcasting Authority for a daytime drama to count towards their local drama quota points.

Despite getting 1.7 million viewers for its first episode at 9.30pm, within a few weeks the show was getting just 135,000 viewers in its regular 11pm timeslot. Most critics described it as rubbish but some changed their minds during the show's second season. 'The Sydney Morning Herald said it was "immeasurably improved in looks, acting and writing" while The Sunday Telegraph named it one of the 10 Best Shows on TV for 1997. The "final" episode was screened on 6 April 2000 before Nine realised a mistake had been made (when the first three episodes had been edited down into a punchier one hour premiere) so they eventually screened the last episode a year later as a one-off send-off. Had it aired without interruption, it would have taken just 18 months to complete its run instead of five years.

Series synopsis
The series was conceived as a flamboyant, melodramatic soap opera and dealt with the lives of wealthy Australians living on the Gold Coast. Although criticised for being an Australian copy of the American soap opera Melrose Place, its outrageous storylines drew comparisons to Nine's early 90s drama series, Chances, and some critics described Pacific Drive as "...Chances on Vallium" – storylines  included corporate scheming, various affairs, serial killers and a lesbian love triangle (the first on an Australian TV soap) – saw the series gain a cult reputation.

Storylines
The soap opera opened with the murder of Sonia Kingsley and introduced all the characters via her murder investigation (the 4WD killer turned out to be her secret lover Adam). Daughter Amber Kingsley came to town and married her stepfather Trey in a bid to get her mother's fortune which was based around a radio station. But her bitchy ways pushed Trey over the edge and he snapped and became a serial killer, eventually murdering Callie, Sondra, Nick, Cameron and his sister-in-law Georgina. He was arrested while holding Amber hostage but was found innocent after faking multiple personalities and escaped the Drive with Bethany, only to electrocute himself while trying to drown her.

Pacific Drive was the first Australian drama to get its own website and the feedback from fans revealed that they loved some characters and loved to hate some others. One who didn't get a mention either way was Laura so writer Bevan Lee did a lookalike story but avoided the twin cliche. When doppelgänger Anna came to town coveting Laura's life (and her fiancé Luke who had been revealed to be Sonia's secret son and therefore another Kingsley heir), Simone Buchanan took turns playing both roles while her former Hey Dad..! co-star Sarah Monahan played her double in two-shots. Luke went in search of his real father, Bill Garland, but he killed himself when it was revealed he had been molesting his daughter Liza who died of an ecstasy overdose in Joel's nightclub.

When Rowena Wallace accidentally overdosed, scripts were hastily re-written for Mara's gay theatrical friend Marcus to continue her scheming. After she returned to the show but in need of more medical care, Mara was hit by a car and woke up with amnesia, now being played by Olivia Hamnett

Amongst all the bed-hopping, Zoe was the most active but only after she came out as a lesbian. Her girlfriends included Margaux, Dior, Sondra, Kay and Gemma before she fell pregnant and married Tim to keep him in the country (with TV Soap remarking that a lesbian and a prostitute marrying must be Australian TV's most bizarre wedding ever). The show's other great legacy amongst its many gay fans was Bethany learning she was HIV positive but when Nine changed the show's direction (preferring to screen it in daytime rather than late night), Bethany remarked how her combination therapies were working and Zoe settled down to wedded bliss with Tim, thereby bringing all edgy stories to an end.

The show ended with Bethany calling off her marriage to Grant when his newly recovered mother Mara began to interfere again. Anna, caught faking a pregnancy to Luke, told Dr Josh she was in love with him and promised she would try to curb her crazy tendencies. Tim died when fell foul of a drug sting gone wrong and Zoe told Martin she would never forgive him for organising the police operation. Amber quit her corporate lifestyle and drove in search of Brett, the former gigolo who had been married to her aunt whom she now realised was the love of her life.

Cast

Original cast members
 Simone Buchanan as Laura Harris and her doppelgänger Anna Dodwell 
 Mark Constable as Adam Stephens, the Kingsley family lawyer who is revealed to be Sonia's killer
 Andre Eikmeier as Rick Carlyle, a real estate agent, involved with Callie and later Bethany
 Steve Harman as Luke Bowman, lifeguard and Sonia's illegitimate son
 Darrin Klimek	as Tim Browning, a Canadian who becomes a male prostitute
 Adrian Lee as Joel Ritchie, Amber's scheming boyfriend from the city, later involved with Bethany
 Joss McWilliam as Martin Harris, police detective investigating Sonia's murder, Laura's brother
 Lloyd Morris as Trey Devlin, Sonia's husband, a talkback radio host
 Kate Raison as Georgina Ellis, Sonia's sister
 Danielle Spencer as Callie Macrae, a paramedic and Zoe's best friend and crush
 Christine Stephen-Daly as Amber Kingsley, Sonia's bitchy, manipulative daughter
 Libby Tanner as Zoe Marshall, a lesbian who works for the Kingsleys
 Erik Thomson as Brett Barrett, a local gigolo involved with Sonia, Tom's mentor on the trade
 Melissa Tkautz as Bethany Daniels, a HIV positive model, involved with Rick, Adam and Joel

Later additions
Rowena Wallace (1996) and Olivia Hamnett (1997) as Mara de Villenois
Grant Bowler as Garth Stephens
Les Hill as Grant Crozier, Bethany's husband
Peter Kowitz as Dr. Josh Michaels
Rebekah Elmaloglou as Eliza Garland
 Katy Charles as Detective Angela Dickinson.

Recurring characters
 Virginia Hey as Margaux Hayes, an American business woman, Zoe's first girlfriend
 Clodagh Crowe as Dior Shelby, Zoe's second girlfriend
 Brigid Kelly as Kay West, Zoe's third girlfriend 
 Helen Dallimore as Sondra Westwood, Zoe's fourth girlfriend 
 Katherine Lee as Gemma Patterson, Zoe's fifth girlfriend
 Arthur Dignam as Marcus, a gay theatrical agent
 Jason Langley as Jo, Tim's transgender friend
 Chris Haywood as Bill Garland, Eliza's father

External links
 
 Pacific Drive at the National Film and Sound Archive

Australian television soap operas
Nine Network original programming
Television shows set in Queensland
1996 Australian television series debuts
1997 Australian television series endings
English-language television shows